Konstantin Aladashvili (born November 27, 1977) is a Russian bobsledder and skeleton racer who has competed since 1999. He finished 22nd in the men's skeleton event at the 2002 Winter Olympics in Salt Lake City. Aladashvili also competed at the FIBT World Championships, finishing 23rd in the men's skeleton event at Calgary, in 2005.

Aladashvili competed in bobsledding from 2000 to 2006, earning his best finish of eighth in a World Cup two-man event held in Sigulda, Latvia. He also competed at the FIBT World Championships, finishing 23rd in the men's skeleton event at Calgary in 2005.

World Cup 2005/2006 results
 24th on November 10, 2005, Calgary CAN
 DNS on November 17, 2005, Lake Placid, New York, U.S.

References
 2002 men's skeleton results
 Bobsleigh.com results of Aladashvili's career
 FIBT profile
 Skeletonsport.com profile

External links
 

1977 births
Living people
Russian male bobsledders
Russian male skeleton racers
Olympic skeleton racers of Russia
Skeleton racers at the 2002 Winter Olympics